Oil and vinegar may refer to:

 Salad dressing, which may contain mixes of oil and vinegar
 French dressing, a term originally used for any oil-and-vinegar-based salad dressing
 Vinaigrette, made by mixing an oil with something acidic such as vinegar or lemon juice
 Oil and Vinegar, a screenplay by John Hughes that was never produced